The 2022 Kansas Attorney General election took place on November 8, 2022, to elect the Attorney General of Kansas. Incumbent Republican Attorney General Derek Schmidt announced he would retire to run for Governor. The Republican nominee was former Kansas Secretary of State Kris Kobach, and the Democratic nominee was former police officer, prosecutor, and state securities regulator, Chris Mann. Kobach narrowly won, taking 50.8% of the general election vote to Mann's 49.2%.

Republican primary

Candidates

Nominee
Kris Kobach, former Secretary of State of Kansas, former Chair of the Kansas Republican Party, and board member of We Build The Wall; candidate for governor in 2018 and U.S. senator in 2020

Eliminated in primary
Tony Mattivi, retired federal prosecutor
Kellie Warren, state senator for the 11th district

Declined
Mike Kagay, district attorney for Kansas's 1st district court
Todd Thompson, district attorney for Kansas's 3rd district court
Blaine Finch, speaker pro tempore of the Kansas House of Representatives
Derek Schmidt, incumbent attorney general (running for Governor)

Endorsements

Polling

Results

Democratic primary

Candidates

Declared
Chris Mann, attorney, former police officer, and former prosecutor.

Results

General election

Predictions

Endorsements

Polling

Results

See also
2022 Kansas elections

Notes

Partisan clients

References

External links
Official campaign websites
Kris Kobach (R) for Attorney General
Chris Mann (D) for Attorney General

Attorney General
Kansas